Mackens Semerzier (born November 3, 1980) is an American retired professional mixed martial artist who last competed in the Featherweight division. A professional competitor from 2008 until 2012, he competed for the UFC and WEC.

Background
In 1999 Mackens placed 6th in the 6A Florida High School Wrestling tournament and was a Disney Duals AAU Wrestling National runner up. At the age of 19, Semerzier signed on to the U.S. Marines. While enrolled, he would begin training a lot of boxing. A little later, through a Marine Corps Martial Arts program, he learned other elements of the MMA game, which he would supplement with training at civilian gyms, most notably Linxx Academy in Virginia Beach, where he still trains and coaches.

Mixed martial arts career

Early career
Semerzier made his pro debut against Ryan Lamareaux on a local North Carolina MMA card. Semerzier won the bout in the third round after locking up a rear naked choke submission. Only a little over a month after his pro debut, Semerzier had his second fight, again winning via rear naked choke submission.

He won two more fights, finishing both opponents, before signing with the World Extreme Cagefighting in 2009.

World Extreme Cagefighting
Semerzier made his debut for the promotion at WEC 43 stunning the former IFL Featherweight Champion, Wagnney Fabiano. Semerzier submitted the Brazilian jiu-jitsu ace in the first round via triangle choke. He earned himself Submission of the Night, and also was awarded "Sherdog's 2009 Upset of the Year".

Semerzier suffered his first career loss to Lithuanian grappler Deividas Taurosevičius at WEC 46.

Semerzier was scheduled to face Anthony Morrison on April 24, 2010 at WEC 48, but Semerzier was forced from the card with an injury. Instead of fighting Morrison, he fought Javier Vazquez. Semerzier was defeated via second round submission on August 18, 2010 at WEC 50.

Semerzier was defeated by Cub Swanson via split decision in a back and forth affair on November 11, 2010 at WEC 52 in a bout that earned Fight of the Night honors.

Ultimate Fighting Championship
In October 2010, World Extreme Cagefighting merged with the Ultimate Fighting Championship. As part of the merger, all WEC fighters were transferred to the UFC.

Semerzier's first fight in the UFC was against UFC newcomer, and The Ultimate Fighter 12 competitor, Alex Caceres, at UFC Fight Night 24. He won the fight via rear naked choke submission early in the first round.

Semerzier was expected to face Yuri Alcantara on August 27, 2011 at UFC 134.  However, Semerzier was replaced on the card by UFC newcomer Antonio Carvalho.

Semerzier was expected to face Mike Lullo on September 17, 2011 at UFC Fight Night 25.  However, Semerzier was forced from the bout with an injury  and was replaced by Robbie Peralta

Semerzier faced Robbie Peralta on November 12, 2011 at UFC on Fox 1. Semerzier officially lost via TKO in the third round, but replays showed that a collision of heads started the stoppage.  The fight was later ruled a no contest by the California State Athletic Commission.

A rematch with Peralta was expected to take place on March 3, 2012 at UFC on FX 2.  However, Peralta was forced out of the bout with a toe injury and replaced by Daniel Pineda.  Pineda defeated Semezier via first round submission.

After losing to Pineda, Semerzier was released from the promotion.

Post UFC
Semerzier made his return to the cage on August 18, 2012 at XFO 45, defeating Guillermo Serment by submission due to a d'arce choke sixty two seconds into the fight.

He then went to on to face Gilbert Jimenez a few months later on November 17, 2012. He defeated Jimenez via submission in the second round. He has not competed since this.

Championships and accomplishments
World Extreme Cagefighting
Submission of the Night (One time)
Fight of the Night (One time)
Sherdog
2009 Upset of the Year (vs. Wagnney Fabiano, WEC 43)

Mixed martial arts record

|-
|Win
|align=center|8–4 (1)
|   Gilbert Jimenez 
|Submission (guillotine choke)
|Combat Sports Challenge 34
|
|align=center|2
|align=center|1:52
|Richmond, Virginia, United States
| 
|-
|Win
|align=center|7–4 (1)
|   Guillermo Serment 
|Submission (d'arce choke)
|XFO 45: Outdoor War 8
|
|align=center|1
|align=center|1:02
|Island Lake, Illinois, United States
| 
|-
|Loss
|align=center|6–4 (1)
|  Daniel Pineda
|Submission (triangle armbar)
|UFC on FX: Alves vs. Kampmann
|
|align=center|1
|align=center|2:05
|Sydney, Australia
| 
|-
| NC
|align=center| 6–3 (1)
|  Robbie Peralta
| NC (accidental headbutt)
| UFC on Fox: Velasquez vs. Dos Santos
| 
|align=center| 3
|align=center| 1:54
|Anaheim, California, United States
| 
|-
| Win
|align=center| 6–3
|  Alex Caceres
| Submission (rear-naked choke)
| UFC Fight Night: Nogueira vs. Davis
| 
|align=center| 1
|align=center| 3:18
|Seattle, Washington, United States
| 
|-
| Loss
|align=center| 5–3
|  Cub Swanson
| Decision (split)
| WEC 52
| 
|align=center| 3
|align=center| 5:00
|Las Vegas, Nevada, United States
| 
|-
| Loss
|align=center| 5–2
|  Javier Vazquez
| Submission (rear-naked choke)
| WEC 50
| 
|align=center| 2
|align=center| 1:35
|Las Vegas, Nevada, United States
| 
|-
| Loss
|align=center| 5–1
| Deividas Taurosevičius
| Decision (unanimous)
| WEC 46
| 
|align=center| 3
|align=center| 5:00
|Sacramento, California, United States
| 
|-
| Win
|align=center| 5–0
|  Wagnney Fabiano
| Submission (triangle choke)
| WEC 43
| 
|align=center| 1
|align=center| 2:14
|San Antonio, Texas, United States
| 
|-
| Win
|align=center| 4–0
|  Kenny Foster
| Submission (triangle choke)
| Elite Fighting Challenge 4
| 
|align=center| 1
|align=center| 1:03
|Norfolk, Virginia, United States
| 
|-
| Win
|align=center| 3–0
|  Jason Hilliker
| TKO (punches)
| Cagefest Xtreme: All In
| 
|align=center| 1
|align=center| 2:01
|Norfolk, Virginia, United States
| 
|-
| Win
|align=center| 2–0
|  Justin Hickey
| Submission (rear-naked choke)
| Cagefest Xtreme: Evolution
| 
|align=center| 1
|align=center| 4:52
|Norfolk, Virginia, United States
| 
|-
| Win
|align=center| 1–0
|  Ryan Lamareaux
| Submission (rear-naked choke)
| Vengeance Fighting Championship 1
| 
|align=center| 3
|align=center| 3:04
|Concord, North Carolina, United States
|

References

External links 
Official UFC Profile

American male mixed martial artists
American sportspeople of Haitian descent
Featherweight mixed martial artists
Mixed martial artists utilizing wrestling
Mixed martial artists utilizing boxing
Mixed martial artists utilizing Brazilian jiu-jitsu
Living people
Mixed martial artists from Florida
1980 births
Ultimate Fighting Championship male fighters
American male sport wrestlers
Amateur wrestlers
American practitioners of Brazilian jiu-jitsu
People awarded a black belt in Brazilian jiu-jitsu